The  took place at the New National Theater in Tokyo on December 30, 2014. The ceremony was televised in Japan on TBS.

Presenters 
 Shin'ichirō Azumi (TBS commentator)
 Yukie Nakama

Winners and winning works

Grand Prix 
 "R.Y.U.S.E.I." — Sandaime J Soul Brothers from Exile Tribe

Best Singer Award 
 EXILE ATSUSHI

Best New Artist Award

Best Album Award 
 TRAD -

New Artist Award 
The artists who are awarded the New Artist Award are nominated for the Best New Artist Award.
 
 SOLIDEMO

Lifetime Achievement Award
 Eiichi Ohtaki

References

External links 
 Japan Record Awards - TBS

2014
Japan Record Awards
Japan Record Awards
Japan Record Awards
Japan Record Awards